Łukasz Zygmunt Pawłowski (born 11 June 1983 in Toruń) is a Polish rower. He won a silver medal in lightweight coxless four at the 2008 Summer Olympics.

Medals
For his sport achievements, he received: 
 Golden Cross of Merit in 2008.
Nominated to "2008 Toruń Citizen of the Year" Gazeta Wyborcza.

References

External links 
 
 
 
 

1983 births
Living people
Polish male rowers
Olympic rowers of Poland
Rowers at the 2008 Summer Olympics
Rowers at the 2012 Summer Olympics
Olympic silver medalists for Poland
Sportspeople from Toruń
Olympic medalists in rowing
Medalists at the 2008 Summer Olympics
World Rowing Championships medalists for Poland
European Rowing Championships medalists